Kosovo is situated in south-eastern Europe. With its central position in the Balkans, it serves as a link in the connection between central and south Europe, the Adriatic Sea, and Black Sea.
Tourism in Kosovo is characterized by archaeological heritage from Illyrian, Dardanian, Roman, Byzantine, Serbian and Ottoman times, traditional Albanian and Serbian cuisine, architecture, religious heritage, traditions, and natural landscapes.

The New York Times included Kosovo on the list of 41 Places to go in 2011. In the same year, Kosovo saw a jump of about 40 places on the Skyscanner flight search engine which rates global tourism growth.

Kosovo's monuments are classified as common property for which the society is responsible to maintain them in order to transmit their authenticity to future generations.

Kosovo has a variety of natural features. It is surrounded by mountains: the Sharr Mountains are located in the south and southeast, bordering North Macedonia, while the Kopaonik Mountains rise in the north. The central region is mainly hilly, but two large plains spread over Kosovo's west and east, respectively, Metohija plain and Kosovo plain.

The bulk of international tourists going to Kosovo are from Albania, Germany, Italy, the United States, the United Kingdom, Croatia and Austria. Tourism is a growing sector with more tourists visiting every year.

Attractions

Cities
Some of the most visited cities include:
 Prishtina — the capital of Kosovo. Pristina accommodates the grave of Kosovo's first president Ibrahim Rugova. The Gërmia and the Italian park are the most visited parks in the city. Other attractions in the capital include the Kosovo museum, the clock tower and the Jashar Pasha Mosque.
Gjakova — a city with nightlife and historical monuments. Monuments include mosques, churches, bridges and museums. 
Peja— a city along the Peć Bistrica river. It is located near the Accursed mountains. The center of the city is marked by different craft shops, such as tailors, goldsmiths and leather tanners. Old mosques like the Bajrakli mosque and the Orthodox church are part of the historical monuments of the city.
Prizren — a town with a well-preserved Ottoman quarter, and a Roman-built castle. Prizren is located on the Prizrenska Bistrica River and is near the Šar Mountains. Prizren contains the Kaljaja Fortress as well as the Serbian Orthodox Our Lady of Ljeviš church.
Novo Brdo- a municipality in central Kosovo. Novo Brdo offers its visitors various hiking and mountain-biking possibilities. Some archaeological localities of the medieval town include the medieval castle, religious buildings and cemeteries.
Ulpiana-  an ancient city of Illyrian Dardania from the 2nd century in the Balkan peninsula. It is known to have been re-constructed by emperor Justinian I.

Natural features
Via Ferrata Ari is a metallic structure in vertical rock which enables people to climb it. Via Ferrata date as structure from world war one. The one in Peć was built by Marimangat e Pejes in 2013 and 2014 with the support of donors. It has more than 100 stairs and the whole trip is around three kilometers. 
 White Drin Waterfall – located in the north of Peć. The White Drin is the largest spring in Kosovo.
 Rugova Canyon – located in the northwest of Peć, with steep walls reaching up to 300 meters.
 Šar Mountains National Park – proclaimed in 1993 and covering 39,000 hectares in South Western Kosovo. The Sharr Mountains border North Macedonia, and are the home of animal species including bears, wolves, deers, and foxes.
 Brezovica ski resort – a ski resort in Šar Mountains National Park in southern Kosovo.
 Prokletije National Park – a proposed national park since 2001 in the area of the Prokletije Mountain Range in western Kosovo and part of the larger Dinaric Alps.
 Gadime Cave – an underground marble cave in the village of lower Gadimlje  near Lipljan that was discovered in 1969 by Ahmet Diti. It has Stalagmites and Stalactites.

Architecture
Medieval Monuments in Kosovo, a combined UNESCO World Heritage Site including:
Patriarchate of Peć, this complex of four churches was built between 1230 and 1330 by the medieval Serbian royal Nemanjić dynasty.  The church was the seat of the Serbian Patriarchate since 1302. It is considered to be of great national importance to Serbs and Serbia.
Visoki Dečani Monastery, one of the most important monasteries of the Serbian Orthodox Church in Kosovo. It was built from 1307- 1328.
Gračanica monastery- was completed in 1321 by the Serbian King Milutin.  The monastery is an example of Serbian medieval (14th century) ecclesiastical architecture, and is a UNESCO World Heritage Site.
Our Lady of Ljeviš

Ottoman Architecture, including:
Imperial Mosque in Prishtina (1461)
Mehmet Pasha's Mosque (1561) which is today encompassed by the Albanian League Museum
Sinan Pasha Mosque in Prizren (1615)
Tomb of Sultan Murad from the 14th Century
Hammams (bathhouses) in Prizren, Prishtina, etc.

Statistics
The Statistical Agency of the Kosovo publishes hotel statistics on a quarterly basis since 2008. 
In 2018, the reported number of hotel nights spent by non-residents was 321,308, compared to 273,394 in the previous year. The number of foreign visitors also increased from 162,234 in 2017 to 192,761 in 2018.

The following table illustrates the number of non resident visitors according to country of origin recorded in 2018. 
The data was issued by the Statistical Office of the Republic of Kosovo.

Issues regarding entering Kosovo
Serbia considers Kosovo to be an integral part of its territory and thus does not consider the designated crossing with Kosovo to be an international border. Serbia does not apply entry or exit stamps to the passports of those using these crossings. Serbia also does not recognize the designated entry points between Kosovo (including Pristina airport) and third countries because they are not under the control of Serbian authorities. Foreign nationals have been denied entry to Serbia by Serbian border officials if they don't have a current Serbian entry stamp in their passport. If a visit to Serbia is planned after visiting Kosovo, entering Serbia via North Macedonia is recommended.

Citizens of Albania, Montenegro and Serbia may use a national ID card at border crossings with no stamping involved. Meanwhile, citizens of EU countries, North Macedonia, Monaco and San Marino may use a biometric national ID card (excluding e.g. Austrian, French and Greek citizens, but including e.g. Dutch, German and Swedish citizens)

See also
Tourism in Pristina
Geography of Kosovo
Culture of Kosovo
Hiking in Kosovo
Medieval Monuments in Kosovo
Cuisine of Kosovo
Architecture of Kosovo
Municipalities of Kosovo

Annotations and references

References:

External links

Official sites
 beinkosovo.com

News articles

Travel publications
Warrander, Gail & Knaus, Verena. 2010. Kosovo: Bradt Travel Guides

 
Kosovo